Berk Neziroğluları (born 1 February 1991) is a Turkish professional footballer who most recently played as a left-back for Pendikspor. He made his Süper Lig debut for Galatasaray against Gençlerbirliği on 16 May 2010.

References

External links
 Berk Neziroğluları at TFF.org
 

1991 births
Living people
People from Beyoğlu
Turkish footballers
Footballers from Istanbul
Association football fullbacks
Turkey youth international footballers
Süper Lig players
TFF First League players
Galatasaray S.K. footballers
Adanaspor footballers
1461 Trabzon footballers
Sivasspor footballers
Manisaspor footballers
Pendikspor footballers